Willis Brewer Windle (December 13, 1904 – December 8, 1981) was a professional baseball player. He played three games over two seasons in Major League Baseball for the Pittsburgh Pirates from 1928-29. He went to the University of Missouri. He was born in Galena, Kansas and died in Corpus Christi, Texas.

External links

Major League Baseball first basemen
Pittsburgh Pirates players
Salisbury-Spencer Colonials players
Newark Bears (IL) players
York White Roses players
Rochester Red Wings players
Toronto Maple Leafs (International League) players
Oklahoma City Indians players
Baseball players from Kansas
1904 births
1981 deaths
People from Galena, Kansas
Missouri Tigers baseball players